The Lark is a 1965 Soviet war film directed by Nikita Kurikhin and Leonid Menaker. It was entered into the 1965 Cannes Film Festival.

Cast
 Gennadi Yukhtin
 Valeri Pogoreltsev
 Valentins Skulme
 Bruno Oja
 Ervin Abel
 Heino Mandri
 Lyudmila Glazova
 Lyubov Malinovskaya

References

External links

1965 films
1965 war films
Films directed by Leonid Menaker
Soviet war films
1960s Russian-language films
World War II prisoner of war films
Films set in Germany
Films about Nazi Germany
Fiction about tanks
Soviet black-and-white films
Lenfilm films
Soviet World War II films
Russian World War II films